= Polomka (river) =

River in Perm Krai, Russia

The Polomka (Russian: Поломка) is a river in Perm Krai of Russia. It is a left tributary of the Gayva, which is a tributary of the Kama. The Polomka is 2.1 kilometres (1.3 mi) long. It flows over the north-western part of Perm.

The slope of the river 16.7 metres per kilometre (88 ft/mi).
